The Ichthys symbol (or "Jesus fish") is a sign typically used to proclaim an affiliation with or affinity for Christianity. The fish was originally adopted by early Christians as a secret symbol, but the many variations known today first appeared in the 1980s. Some of these are made by Christians in order to promote a specific doctrine or theological perspective, such as evolutionary creation. Other variations are intended for the purpose of satire by non-Christian groups.

Both the traditional ichthys fish as well as its variations, are often seen adorning the bumpers or trunks of automobiles mainly in the United States, often in the form of adhesive badges made of chrome-colored plastic.

Ichthys symbol 

An ancient Hellenistic Christian slogan espoused the Greek acronym/acrostic  for "" (""), which translates into English as 'Jesus Christ, Son of God, Saviour'; the Greek word  translating to 'fish' in English. The first appearances of fish symbols as adopted in Christian art and literature date to the 2nd century CE. Some modern fish symbol variations, called the Jesus fish, contain the English word Jesus in the center, or are empty entirely.

Parodies 

Jeroen Temperman states that there are "variations on this Ichthys symbol. Some variations add feet to the fish and inscribe Darwin in the body. Others make reference to sushi, sharks, the food chain, fast food, the devil or death. How are we to interpret these variations? These adaptations are themselves susceptible to multiple interpretations, ranging from humour to critique, to mocking derision, to blasphemy."  Among such parodies are the Darwin fish, often displayed by atheists in the United States, and the Fish-hungry shark, displayed by Muslims in Egypt.

Responses 
Another variation has been offered by people who see no conflict between Christian belief and the evidence of science regarding evolution: a depiction of the Jesus fish and the Darwin fish kissing. Such images have been sold as bumper stickers and have also been improvised. The writer Michael Dowd, author of the book Thank God for Evolution, has been among the more prominent promoters of this image.

Criticism 
Rhetorical scholar Thomas Lessl conducted a survey of users of the Darwin fish emblem. Based on their responses, he interprets the symbol as scientific "blackface", a parody that is one part mockery and one part imitation. Lessl suggests that the "various ideas that users plainly compress into this emblem are suggestive of scientism", and adds that the Darwin fish is an advertisement for the conflict thesis, an idea, which according to Lessl, is "now thoroughly discredited by historians".

Jonah Goldberg, in the Los Angeles Times criticized the Darwin fish, stating that:

In the National Review, Goldberg further stated that "one of the problems with the Darwin Fish is that it assumes all Jesus Fishers are Creationists. And I agree that this is one of the problems. But it is not the only one. The 'evolve' fish, I think has a double-meaning in that it suggests Christians should evolve from Christianity. I also think mucking about with the symbol of the fish is itself offensive because the symbol is sacred and has no secular counterpart."

Artgemeinschaft 

The German Artgemeinschaft group, promoting racist neopaganism, uses a registered symbol showing an eagle catching an ichthys fish. This symbol, known as "Eagle catching Fish" (German: Adler fängt Fisch) was later used by other racist groups such as neo-Nazis in Germany. While the symbol was created and used by far-right pagan circles, not all groups that use it have far-right tendencies or are racist, though many do promote anti-Christian sentiment. In 2012, a coat of arms for the new district of Mecklenburgische Seenplatte was proposed including among things the depiction of the eagle catching a fish that was previously used in the coat of arms of the former district of Müritz which was one of the districts merged to create Mecklenburgische Seenplatte. The coat of arms was rejected for use after discovery of the fact that the "Eagle catching Fish" symbol was used by neo-Nazis as they are treated with distain in German public opinion with its symbols subsequently stigmatized (and for some symbols, banned altogether).

Fish-hungry sharks 
In Egypt, many Coptic Orthodox Christians display the fish symbol on their vehicles as a sign of their faith, and Islamic fundamentalists responded with "fish-hungry sharks", some including the phrase "no god but Allah" within the body of the shark. One Egyptian Muslim was quoted in The Day as saying "The Christians had the fish so we responded with the shark. If they want to portray themselves as weak fishes, OK. We are the strongest."

References 

Ichthys, Variations
Ichthys, Variations
Ichthys, Variations
Lists of symbols

de:Fisch (Christentum)#Parodien und Polemik